Cynthia Kadohata (born July 2, 1956) is a Japanese American children's writer best known for her young adult novel Kira-Kira which won the Newbery Medal in 2005. She won the National Book Award for Young People's Literature in 2013 for The Thing About Luck.

Biography
Kadohata was born in Chicago, Illinois. Her first published short story appeared in The New Yorker in 1986. She received a BA in journalism from the University of Southern California in 1979. She also attended graduate programs at the University of Pittsburgh and Columbia University.

Kadohata started her writing career with short story submissions to magazines. Her first publication, titled Charlie O., was published in 1986 in The New Yorker. Later stories were published in The Pennsylvania Review, Grand Street, and Ploughshares.  

Weedflower, her second children's book, was published in Spring 2006.  It is about the Poston internment camp where her father was imprisoned during World War II.  Her third children's novel, Cracker! The Best Dog in Vietnam about the Vietnam War from a war dog's perspective, was published in January 2007 by Atheneum Books for Young Readers.

Outside Beauty, another children's novel, was published in 2008. It is about a 13-year-old girl and her three sisters, all fathered by different men and what happens when she and her sisters are separated from each other after their mother gets into an accident.

At least two of Kadohata's books touch on the topic of chick sexing. The family of the main character in her first novel, 1989's The Floating World, and also the family of the protagonist in 2004's Kira-Kira are employed at chicken hatcheries separating male chicks from female. Kadohata's inspiration was her own personal experience. Her father was a chick sexer during her childhood.

As of January 2021, Kadohata lived in Los Angeles with her boyfriend, son, and dogs.

Novels 
 The Floating World (Viking, 1989)
In the Heart of the Valley of Love (Viking, 1992)
The Glass Mountains (Clarkston, GA, White Wolf Pub, 1995), illus. Terese Nielson and Larry S. Friedman
 Kira-Kira (Atheneum, 2004)
 Newbery Medal 
 Asian/Pacific American Award for Literature - Youth Literature 
 Weedflower (Atheneum, 2006)
 PEN USA Award
 Cracker! The Best Dog in Vietnam (Atheneum, 2007) 
 California Young Reader Medal, 2011
 North Carolina Children's Book Award, Ohio Buckeye Children's Book Award, Nebraska Golden Sower, Kansas William Allen White Children's Book Award, South Carolina Junior Book Award
 Outside Beauty (Atheneum, 2008)
 A Million Shades of Gray (Atheneum, 2010)
 The Thing About Luck (Atheneum, 2013), illustrated by Julia Kuo 
 National Book Award for Young People's Literature
 Asian/Pacific American Award for Literature - Youth Literature 
 Half a World Away (Atheneum, 2014)
 Checked (Atheneum, 2018)
 A Place to Belong (Atheneum, 2019)
 Vape (Caitlyn Dlouhy, 2023)

Short Stories
 Charlie O., (The New Yorker, October 12, 1986)
 Seven Moons, (Grand Street vol 7 no 4, 1988)
 Breece D'J Pancake, (Mississippi Review vol 18 no 1, 1989)
 Gray Girl, (Ploughshares 25, December, 1, 1999)

See also

References

 Staff (September 2007) "Cynthia Kadohata 1956– " Biography Today 15(3)  pp. 38–49

External links

 
 Profile at The Whiting Foundation
 :de:Amerikanische Kinder- und Jugendliteratur
 

1956 births
Living people
Writers from Chicago
American children's writers
American writers of Japanese descent
Newbery Medal winners
National Book Award for Young People's Literature winners
20th-century American novelists
21st-century American novelists
20th-century American women writers
21st-century American women writers
American women children's writers
Columbia University alumni
USC Annenberg School for Communication and Journalism alumni
American women novelists
Novelists from Illinois
American novelists of Asian descent
American women writers of Asian descent